Words of Gold is a multiplayer word game developed by Cupcake Entertainment. It was released in November 2014 for Facebook, December 2015 for Android, and February 2016 for iOS.

Game-play

General
Words of Gold is a word puzzle scrabble game. Each level has an empty game board with a starting point for words and might contain obstacles. Random letters available to form words are placed at the bottom, and the user needs to drag them onto the board. The player can create words horizontally or vertically.

Each level contains a certain objective that must be completed in a given number of moves (or on a time limit). Some levels require clearing "moss" off the board by making matches on top of them, reaching a certain score, getting top hat items to the bottom of the board, or having to clear a certain number of words.

Levels may also contain blocks to make them more difficult, such as boxes or bombs (which end the level if they are not matched before they go off), multi-layered moss blocks, and others. Boosters can be earned or purchased to assist at levels.

Letters
Additional letters are placed in the pile by matching a combination of five letters. Blank letters show up randomly and can act as any letter.

Letters marked with a small number in the left corner at the bottom of the tile give the player more points.

Illusion letters are purple tiles on which a new letter is displayed every round.

Boosters
Boosters include Hints (shows a word), Shuffle (reorders all words), Wand (changes letter to a blue or green colored letter), Hammer (clears a piece from the board), and Rainbow (all colored words explode). Extra Moves or Extra Time can also be acquired through in-app purchases.

In-app Purchases
The game is primarily monetized through in-app purchases (through Facebook credits). 

Players begin with five "lives", which are lost whenever the player fails a level, a common feature in Cupcake’s games. When they run out of lives, users can send requests to their Facebook friends for more lives, wait for them to replenish themselves (a life is restored every thirty minutes), and/or purchase them. 

At certain points of the game, primarily at the start of new "episodes", users must also either purchase or receive a request from at least three friends before they may access the next set of levels. 

The game also includes in-game advertisements to monetize users that choose to play for free. The game includes freemium content similar to the likes of Candy Crush.

Passing Episodes
Once all levels in an episode are completed, the next episode (starting at episode 2) is locked and the player must either get three friends on Facebook to send them "tickets" to unlock the next episode. It can also be unlocked directly through the in-game store. Other than waiting for the time period until mystery quests are available, using in-app purchases is the only way to unlock episodes.

Story
Throughout the game, the player solves puzzles to help the six colorful tamarins defeat the Evil Owls.

Reception

Words of Gold has over 150 thousand players and around 5,000 active players every day. The game received particular mention in Brazilian media due to its popularity in the country. Cupcake Entertainment, the developer of the game, is a Brazilian company.

Prequel
In October 2013, a prequel titled Letters of Gold was soft-launched by Cupcake Entertainment. The game has a similar design but different gameplay mechanics, bringing its challenges to a word puzzle engine similar to Candy Crush. As of September 2015, there are 440 Letters of Gold levels. Its mobile version is reportedly under development.

References

External links
 

2014 video games
Android (operating system) games
Facebook games
IOS games
Puzzle video games
Word puzzle video games
Tile-matching video games
Video games developed in Brazil